Sumiswald-Grünen railway station is a railway station in the municipality of Sumiswald, in the Swiss canton of Bern. It is an intermediate stop on the standard gauge  of BLS AG.

Services 
The following services stop at Sumiswald-Grünen:

 :

References

External links 
 
 

Railway stations in the canton of Bern
BLS railway stations